Müden (Aller) is a municipality in the district of Gifhorn, in Lower Saxony, Germany. It is situated at the confluence of the rivers Aller and Oker. The Municipality Müden includes the villages of Bokelberge, Brenneckenbrück, Dieckhorst, Ettenbüttel, Flettmar, Gerstenbüttel, Gilde, Hahnenhorn and Müden.

References

Gifhorn (district)